Princess Amalie Isabella of Bavaria (15 December 1921 – 28 March 1985) was a member of the Bavarian Royal House of Wittelsbach.

Biography
Princess Amalie Isabella of Bavaria was born to Prince Konrad of Bavaria and Princess Bona Margherita of Savoy-Genoa on 15 December 1921. Her parents, who were both of royal station, were second cousins. Amalie Isabella was the older sister of Prince Eugen of Bavaria (16 July 1925 Munich, Bavaria – 1 January 1997 Grasse, Alpes-Maritimes, France).

On 25 August 1949, in the city of Lugano, Switzerland, Amalie Isabella married Count Umberto Poletti Galimberti, Count di Assandri (21 June 1921 in Milan – 18 February 1995 in Milan). He was the son of Luciano Poletti and Adriana Galimberti. Together Amalie Isabella and Poletti had one son:

Carlo Tomasso Guillermo Poletti Galimberti, Count di Assandri di Bavieria (born 9 June 1950 in Porto Alegre), married on 14 April 1988 in Milan, Nobile Loredana Biffi (born 1957). They have two children:
Tomaso Eugenio de Baviera Poletti Galimberti de Assandri (born 10 April 1989 in Milan)
Isabella-Amalia de Baviera Poletti Galimberti de Assandri (born 1991)

Ancestry

References

1921 births
1985 deaths
Bavarian princesses
House of Wittelsbach
People from the Kingdom of Bavaria